Ahmad Adib Zreik (born 27 October 1990) is a Lebanese former professional footballer who played as a winger.

Club career

Ahed 
Coming through the youth system, Zreik began his career at Ahed aged 18 in 2008.

Al-Wehdat
On 11 February 2021, Zreik joined Jordanian Pro League side Al-Wehdat, on loan until 30 November. He made his debut in the Jordan Shield Cup on 23 February, in a 1–0 win in the group stage against Sahab. Zreik's first assist came on 4 March, in the second game of the Shield Cup group stage against Ma'an, which ended 4–0. On 13 March, Zreik scored his first goal in the final against Al-Jalil, opening the scoring in the first minute; Al-Wehdat eventually lost on penalty shoot-outs after drawing 1–1.

On 4 April, Zreik helped Al-Wehdat win the Jordan Super Cup against Al-Jazeera, scoring a header at the end of the first half in a 2–0 win. Zreik made his AFC Champions League debut on 14 April, drawing 0–0 against Saudi Arabian side Al Nassr; he was named player of the match. On 26 April, Zreik became the first Lebanese player to score in the AFC Champions League, helping Al-Wehdat win their first game in the competition 2–1 against Al Nassr, also making an assist; he was included in the AFC Champions League Team of the Week.

Zreik made his league debut on 9 May, playing the second half of a 2–0 away win against Ma'an. He scored his first league goal on 16 July, helping his team beat Sahab 2–1. On 15 August, Zreik scored in the 2021 Jordan FA Cup round of 32 against Shabab Hwarah, which Al-Wehdat won 4–1. He finished the season with three goals and one assist in 19 league games.

Return to Ahed 
On 12 January 2023, Zreik announced his retirement from football.

International career
Zreik represented Lebanon at the 2008 AFC U-19 Championship, having scored two goals in five appearances during the qualifiers. He scored in Lebanon's 5–1 defeat to Tajikistan.

Zreik made his senior debut for Lebanon in a 2–0 home loss against China in a 2011 AFC Asian Cup qualifying match on 14 November 2009. He was substituted onto the field in the 60th minute for Mahmoud El Ali. He made his last international appearance in 2013.

Career statistics

International

Scores and results list Lebanon's goal tally first, score column indicates score after each Zreik goal.

Honours
Ahed
 AFC Cup: 2019
 Lebanese Premier League: 2009–10, 2010–11, 2014–15, 2016–17, 2017–18, 2018–19, 2021–22
 Lebanese FA Cup: 2008–09, 2010–11, 2017–18, 2018–19
 Lebanese Elite Cup: 2008, 2010, 2011, 2013, 2015, 2022
 Lebanese Super Cup: 2008, 2010, 2011, 2015, 2017, 2018, 2019

Al-Wehdat
 Jordan Super Cup: 2021
 Jordan Shield Cup runner-up: 2021

Individual
 Lebanese Premier League Best Player: 2016–17
 Lebanese Premier League Team of the Season: 2008–09, 2011–12, 2015–16, 2016–17, 2017–18
 Lebanese Premier League top assist provider: 2008–09

References

External links

 
 
 
 
 
 

1990 births
Living people
People from Bint Jbeil District
Lebanese footballers
Association football wingers
Al Ahed FC players
Al-Wehdat SC players
Lebanese Premier League players
Jordanian Pro League players
Lebanese expatriate footballers
Lebanese expatriate sportspeople in Jordan
Expatriate footballers in Jordan
Lebanon youth international footballers
Lebanon international footballers
AFC Cup winning players